Todo mujer is a 2015 Spanish drama film directed by Rafael Gordon and portrayed by Isabel Ordaz, Julia Quintana, Miguel Torres, Arantxa de Juan and Alfonso Arranz.

It receives 14 chosen candidates.

Cast 
 Alfonso Arranz Lago
 Arantxa de Juan as Erika
 Andrea Domingo Gómez
 Isabel Ordaz as Amalia
 Paula Pérez
 Julia Quintana
 Miguel Torres García

References

External links 
 

2015 films
Films shot in Segovia
Spanish drama films
2010s Spanish films